Valter Skarsgård (born 25 October 1995) is a Swedish actor.

Personal life
Skarsgård is the youngest son of actor Stellan Skarsgård and My Skarsgård, a physician. He has seven siblings, five of whom are from his father's first marriage: Alexander, Gustaf, Sam, Bill, and Eija. He has two half-brothers, Ossian and Kolbjörn, from his father's second marriage. Valter Skarsgård studied at S:t Eriks gymnasium.

Selected filmography

Film

Television

References

External links
 

1995 births
21st-century Swedish male actors
Living people
Male actors from Stockholm
Valter
Swedish expatriates in Canada
Swedish expatriates in the United States